Hamilton County is a county located on the Edwards Plateau in the U.S. state of Texas. As of the 2020 census, its population was 8,222. The county seat is Hamilton. The county was created in 1858. It is named for James Hamilton Jr., a former governor of South Carolina who gave financial aid to the Republic of Texas.

History
Indigenous peoples were the first inhabitants of the area. Later Native American tribes settled in the area, including Tawakoni, Tonkawa, Waco and Comanche.

In 1821, shortly after Mexico claimed its independence from Spain, Anglo settlers from the North came to Texas, claiming Mexican citizenship.

Following Texas's independence from Mexico (1836) and its annexation by the United States (1845), Robert Carter and family became the first permanent white settlers in the county in 1854. The next year, settlers James Rice, Henry Standefer, Frederic Bookerman, William Beauchamp, and Asa Langford formed a community that later becomes the town of Hamilton. Asa Langford began Langford's Cove, which later grows into present-day Evant. In 1858 the Sixth Texas Legislature formed Hamilton County, named after James Hamilton Jr., from parts of Comanche, Bosque, and Lampasas counties. In 1858, Hamilton was named the county seat.

Despite growing white settlements in Texas, Indian tribal presences remained. In 1867, Comanche raiders attacked a school where Ann Whitney was the teacher. She helped students escape before finally succumbing to 18 Comanche arrows.

In 1882, the Hico community initiated the annual Hico Old Settlers' Reunion.

By 1900, cotton cultivation had spread to almost  of county land. By 1907, the Stephenville North and South Texas Railway had connected Hamilton with Stephenville. The St. Louis Southwestern Railway of Texas connected Hamilton with Gatesville and Comanche in 1911.

In 1934, the Civil Works Administration's payroll included 747 Hamilton County men, who together earned about $2,000 per day.

In 1950, Ollie P. Roberts (also known as Ollie L. Roberts, "Brushy Bill" Roberts, or William Henry Roberts), a resident of Hico during the late 1940s, claimed to have been the outlaw Billy The Kid. The assertion is based on a legend that Patrick F. Garrett helped Billy fake his own death.  Hico Chamber of Commerce responded by opening a Billy The Kid Museum.

In 2009, Hamilton was invaded by the West Texas Rattlesnake.

Geography

Major highways
  U.S. Highway 84
  U.S. Highway 281
  State Highway 6
  State Highway 22
  State Highway 36
  State Highway 220

Adjacent counties
 Erath County (north)
 Bosque County (northeast)
 Coryell County (southeast)
 Lampasas County (south)
 Mills County (southwest)
 Comanche County (northwest)

Demographics

Note: the US Census treats Hispanic/Latino as an ethnic category. This table excludes Latinos from the racial categories and assigns them to a separate category. Hispanics/Latinos can be of any race.

As of the census of 2000, there were 8,229 people, 3,374 households, and 2,324 families residing in the county.  The population density was 10 people per square mile (4 per km2).  There were 4,455 housing units at an average density of 5 per square mile (2 per km2).  The racial makeup of the county was 93.81% White, 0.15% (12) Black or African American, 0.44% (36) Native American, 0.15% (12) Asian, 0.05% (4) Pacific Islander, 4.36% from other races, and 1.05% from two or more races.  7.41% of the population were Hispanic or Latino of any race.

There were 3,374 households, out of which 27.40% had children under the age of 18 living with them, 58.20% were married couples living together, 7.70% had a female householder with no husband present, and 31.10% were non-families. 28.40% of all households were made up of individuals, and 17.40% had someone living alone who was 65 years of age or older.  The average household size was 2.37 and the average family size was 2.89. As of the 2010 census, there were about 2.9 same-sex couples per 1,000 households in the county.

In the county, the population was spread out, with 23.80% under the age of 18, 6.00% from 18 to 24, 22.90% from 25 to 44, 23.80% from 45 to 64, and 23.60% who were 65 years of age or older.  The median age was 43 years. For every 100 females there were 93.50 males.  For every 100 females age 18 and over, there were 87.10 males.

The median income for a household in the county was $31,150, and the median income for a family was $39,494. Males had a median income of $26,703 versus $20,192 for females. The per capita income for the county was $16,800.  About 10.60% of families and 14.20% of the population were below the poverty line, including 21.20% of those under age 18 and 13.80% of those age 65 or over.

Notable people
 Brushy Bill, the man who claimed to be the infamous outlaw, Billy the Kid, died in Hico, Texas and is buried in Hamiliton County.

Media
Hamilton County is currently listed as part of the Dallas-Fort Worth DMA. Local media outlets include: KDFW-TV, KXAS-TV, WFAA-TV, KTVT-TV, KERA-TV, KTXA-TV, KDFI-TV, KDAF-TV, and KFWD-TV. Because the county is located in Central Texas and neighbors the Killeen-Temple-Fort Hood Metropolitan Statistical Area, all of the Waco/Temple/Killeen market stations also provide coverage for Hamilton County. They include: KCEN-TV, KWTX-TV, KXXV-TV, KWKT-TV, KNCT (TV), and KAKW-DT.

Communities

Cities
 Cranfills Gap (mostly in Bosque County)
 Hamilton (county seat)
 Hico

Town
 Evant (partly in Coryell County)

Unincorporated communities

 Aleman
 Carlton
 Fairy
 Indian Gap
 Jonesboro (partly in Coryell County)
 Ohio
 Pottsville
 Shive
 Sunshine

Ghost Town
 McGirk

Gallery

Politics

See also

 National Register of Historic Places listings in Hamilton County, Texas
 Recorded Texas Historic Landmarks in Hamilton County

References

External links
 Official Hamilton County Site
 

 
1858 establishments in Texas
Populated places established in 1858